Attorney General Chapman may refer to:

Henry Samuel Chapman (1803–1881), Attorney-General of Victoria
Vickie Chapman (born 1957), Attorney-General of South Australia